Newsam may refer to:

Albert Newsam (1809–1864), American artist
Bartholomew Newsam (died 1593), clockmaker to Queen Elizabeth I, probably born in York
Frank Newsam, GCB, KBE, CVO, MC (1893–1964), British civil servant, Permanent Under-Secretary of State at the Home Office from 1948 to 1957
John M. Newsam, British materials scientist, business innovator and entrepreneur, adjunct professor at UC San Diego
Peter Newsam (born 1928), English educationist and a member of the Oxford Education Society

See also
Fowler Newsam Hall, Grade II listed group of Victorian school buildings
Temple Newsam, Tudor-Jacobean house in Leeds, West Yorkshire, England, with grounds landscaped by Capability Brown
Temple Newsam (ward), electoral ward of Leeds City Council, West Yorkshire
Temple Newsam Preceptory, Templar farmstead, just east of Leeds, in West Yorkshire, England